P. californica  may refer to:
 Paeonia californica, the California peony or wild peony, a plant species endemic to southwest California
 Parnassia californica, the California grass of Parnassus, a flowering plant species  native to the mountains of Oregon, California and Nevada
 Perideridia californica, the California yampah, a flowering plant species endemic to California
 Phacelia californica, the California phacelia and California scorpionweed, a plant species native to coastal northern California and Oregon
 Phalaris californica, the California canarygrass, an uncommon grass species native to southern Oregon and northern and central California
 Phragmatopoma californica, the sandcastle worm, honeycomb worm or honeycomb tube worm, a reef-forming marine polychaete worm species found on the Californian coast, from Sonoma County to northern Baja California
 Phryganidia californica, the California oakworm or California oak moth, a moth species found along the coasts of California and Oregon
 Plagiodera californica, a leaf beetle
 Polioptila californica, the California gnatcatcher, a small insectivorous bird species
 Polygala californica, the California milkwort, a flowering plant species native to southwestern Oregon and northern and central California
 Pteronarcys californica, the giant stonefly or salmonfly, an aquatic insect species

Synonyms
 Phomopsis californica, a synonym for Diaporthe citri, a plant pathogen species
 Pyrocleptria californica, a synonym for Schinia aurantiaca, a moth species found in North America, including California and Arizona

See also
 List of Latin and Greek words commonly used in systematic names#C